Helmut Glück (born 23 July 1949, Stuttgart) is a German linguist.

Life 
Helmut Glück studied German studies, Scandinavian studies and Slavic studies in Tübingen and Bochum and worked at the universities of  Osnabrück, Hannover, Oldenburg, Siegen and Cairo. From 1991 to 2015 he was professor of German Linguistics and German as a Foreign Language at the University of Bamberg.

Glück's studies are principally concerned with the German language as a foreign language, its history and its politics (e.g. discussion of German linguistic science). He edits the Metzler Lexikon Sprache, now in its fourth edition, 700 of whose articles are also by him.

He is the speaker of the jury for the Kulturpreis Deutsche Sprache, an annual award supporting the creative development of the German language.

Works

Monographs
 Die Fremdsprache Deutsch im Zeitalter der Aufklärung, der Klassik und der Romantik. Grundzüge der deutschen Sprachgeschichte in Europa. Harrassowitz, Wiesbaden 2013, .
 with Yvonne Pörzgen: Deutschlernen in Russland und in den baltischen Ländern vom 17. Jahrhundert bis 1941. Harrassowitz, Wiesbaden 2009, .
 with Ineta Polanska: Johann Ernst Glück (1654–1705): Pastor, Philologe, Volksaufklärer im Baltikum und in Russland. (= Fremdsprachen in Geschichte und Gegenwart. Bd. 1). Harrassowitz, Wiesbaden 2005, .
 Deutsch als Fremdsprache in Europa vom Mittelalter bis zur Barockzeit. de Gruyter, Berlin 2002, .
 Schrift und Schriftlichkeit. Eine sprach- und kulturwissenschaftliche Studie. Metzler, Stuttgart 1987, . (Zugleich: Habilitations-Schrift. Universität Hannover, 1984)
 with Wolfgang Werner Sauer: Gegenwartsdeutsch. (= Sammlung Metzler 252). Metzler, Stuttgart u. a. 1990, . (2., überarbeitete und erweiterte Auflage. ebenda 1997).

As editor
 Fremdsprachen in Geschichte und Gegenwart. Bd. 1–lfd., 2005–lfd., .
 Die Geschichte des Deutschen als Fremdsprache. Bd. 1–lfd., 2002–lfd., .
 Metzler-Lexikon Sprache. Metzler, Stuttgart u. a. 1993,  (4., aktualisierte und  überarbeitete Auflage. ebenda 2010, ; 5. Aufl. mit Michael Rödel als Mitherausgeber, 2016).

References

External links 
 
  CV
  Detailed CV (PDF-Datei; 15 kB)

Living people
Scientists from Stuttgart
1949 births
Germanists